Cedar Crest High School is a public high school located in Lebanon, Pennsylvania. The school serves over 2000 students in grades 9 to 12 in the Cornwall-Lebanon School District.

General information
Cedar Crest High School was founded in 1966. The current principal is Mr. Christopher Groff. Population of the school is estimated at over 2000 students. The high school runs on a periods system that is based on 45 minute classes. Each Wednesday, Activity Period is added at the beginning of the day to allow time for clubs and other organizations to meet. In October 2009, the school won the award for America's Best High Schools, after its Academic Achievements goal was set and after winning against every Pennsylvania High School.

Academics
Cedar Crest High School offers four (4) different levels of classes to meet the needs of students including applied, college prep, honors, Advanced Placement courses, and learning support. Students also have the option of enrolling in College in the High School classes, where they can complete college level classes for both college and high school credit. College classes are available for students to take through Harrisburg Area Community College and the University of Pittsburgh. All students are required to complete 3 credits in the areas of mathematics, social studies, and science. Students are also required to complete 4 credits in the area of English. In addition, students must complete a certain number of electives each year as well as the completion of a senior project.

The school offers foreign language study in Spanish, French, German, and Latin. Each language is offered at levels 1 through 4, with levels 3 and 4 of each language ranked as an honors level course. The exception to this rule is Spanish, which has a level 2 ranked as an honors course. In addition, students also have the option of taking College Spanish. Although students do not have to study a language to graduate, many students participate in the foreign language program for two years in order to meet possible college requirements.

The AP courses offered are Art History, Biology, Calculus AB, Calculus BC, Chemistry, Computer Science, English Language and Composition, English Literature and Composition, U.S. Government and Politics, Macroeconomics, United States History, Human Geography, European History, Physics C, Psychology, and Statistics. In addition, they offer many elective classes in the areas of agricultural sciences, art, music, earth and space sciences, sociology, humanities, and applied arts.

In 2010, the school created a new program called Mandatory Academic Support (MAS). Students are assigned to this program by a teacher. The program was designed so that teachers may not simply fail students who choose not to do projects, but to give them the opportunity to do work with the assistance of a teacher.

Clubs and organizations
The school offers a variety of different clubs including Anime Club, Book Club, Big Star Program, Byte Club, Drama Club, FBLA, FCA, FCCLA, FFA, French Club, German Club, Gay-Straight Alliance, Key Club, Kite Club, Latin Club, Marketing Club, NHS, Peer Mediation, Model UN, Morning Announcement Club, Office Fan Club, Ping Pong, Quest, Quiz Bowl, SADD, SEE Club, SFC Club, Spanish Club, Student Council, Talon, TATU, Tri-M, TSA, Young Democrats Club, and Young Republicans Club. In addition, the school performs a play during the fall and a musical during the spring. Recent musical productions have included How to Succeed in Business Without Really Trying, Li'l Abner, Jekyll & Hyde, Kiss Me, Kate, Little Mary Sunshine, and Grease.

Musical groups include Chorus, Women's Chorus, Concert Choir, Show Choir, Marching Band, Concert Band, Wind Ensemble, Jazz Band, Orchestra, and Chamber Orchestra. Scott Muenz is the current director of the Marching Band, Concert Band, Wind Ensemble, and the Jazz Band. Members of the Concert Choir, Show Choir, Wind Ensemble, and Jazz Band are all selected by audition. Many students in select groups participate in county, district, regional, and state festivals and competitions. All musical groups except for the Show Choir and Jazz Band hold a winter and spring concert. Because of scheduling, the Show Choir and Jazz Band hold a separate concert in the spring.

Notable alumni
 Dave Arnold, Pennsylvania state senator, former Lebanon County district attorney
 Derek Fisher, baseball player
 Jamie Lynn Gray (née Beyerle) (born May 26, 1984, in Lebanon, Pennsylvania) is an American sport shooter who won a gold medal at the 2012 Summer Olympics in women's 50 metre rifle three positions
 Frank Reich, former NFL quarterback, head coach Carolina Panthers
 Sam Yoon, Boston, Massachusetts City Councillor

References

External links
 Cornwall-Lebanon School District

Educational institutions established in 1966
Public high schools in Pennsylvania
Schools in Lebanon County, Pennsylvania
1966 establishments in Pennsylvania